French Israelism (also called Franco-Israelism) is the French nationalist belief that people of Frankish descent in general, and the Merovingian dynasty in particular, are the direct lineal descendants of the Ten Lost Tribes of Israel, specifically, the descendants of the Tribe of Benjamin.
 
One of the earliest scholars who claimed that he could trace the ten lost tribes of Israel to France was the French Huguenot writer, Jacques Abbadie, who fled French Roman Catholic persecution and later settled in London, England. In his 1723 work, The Triumph Of Providence, he wrote:

The claim became one of the foundational elements for the Priory of Sion hoax created by Pierre Plantard and Philippe de Chérisey in the 1960s, and it was fused with the notion of a Jesus bloodline and popularized in 1982 by the authors of the speculative nonfiction book The Holy Blood and the Holy Grail, and in 2003 by Dan Brown for his 2003 mystery thriller novel The Da Vinci Code.

See also
 British Israelism
 Groups claiming affiliation with Israelites
 Nordic Israelism

Notes 

Groups claiming Israelite descent
Pseudohistory
Neologisms